Ayhancan Güven  (born 2 January 1998) is a Turkish racing driver and a Porsche factory driver. He competes in the ADAC GT Masters currently.

Born in 1998 in Istanbul, Ayhancan grown up with the racing background of his father. He's been on wheels since he was four years old. On the first steps with race simulations and go-kart, he enjoyed winning different racing categories. He is currently racing in the ADAC GT Masters. He is also a member of the sim racing team " VRS Coanda Simsport".

Career
Güven finished the 2018 season of the Porsche Carrera Cup France as champion. He repeated his champion title in the next season of the Porsche Carrera Cup France in 2019. Also in 2018 he won the FIA GT Nations Cup, representing his home country alongside Salih Yoluç. The event was the predecessor to the FIA Motorsport Games.

He won the fourth round of the 2019 Porsche Supercup in Silverstone Circuit starting at the pole position.
He was named the Junior 2020 Porsche Motorsport, and finished 2020 season as third with 113 points.
For 2021 season of Porsche Supercup, he signed with BWT Lechner Racing.

2022 - He competed with Christian Engelhart in Team Joos Sportwagentechnik in ADAC GT Masters and finished runner-up in the standing.

Racing record

Career summary

† As Güven was a guest driver, he was not eligible to score points. * Season still in progress.

Porsche Supercup results

Notes
† – Driver did not finish the race, but were classified as they completed over 75% of the race distance.

Porsche Carrera Cup France results

Porsche Carrera Cup Germany results

Porsche Sprint Challenge Middle East results

Complete Deutsche Tourenwagen Masters results
(key) (Races in bold indicate pole position) (Races in italics indicate fastest lap)

Complete Asian Le Mans Series results 
(key) (Races in bold indicate pole position) (Races in italics indicate fastest lap)

References

External links
Personal website

Living people
1998 births
Turkish racing drivers
Porsche Supercup drivers
ADAC GT Masters drivers
Deutsche Tourenwagen Masters drivers
Nürburgring 24 Hours drivers
Walter Lechner Racing drivers
AF Corse drivers
Porsche Motorsports drivers
FIA Motorsport Games drivers
Phoenix Racing drivers
Toksport WRT drivers
Porsche Carrera Cup Germany drivers
Asian Le Mans Series drivers